Max Bachhuber (December 13, 1832 – February 2, 1879) was an American farmer, businessman, and politician.

Born in Bavaria, he moved to the United States in 1846 and settled in Addison, Wisconsin. He then moved to Milwaukee, Wisconsin and then in 1855 moved to LeRoy, Wisconsin. He was a farmer and store owner. He was postmaster and served in several town offices. He served in the Wisconsin State Assembly in 1860, 1864, and 1875 as a Democrat. His son Andrew Bachhuber, his grandson Frank E. Bachhuber, and great-granddaughter Ruth Bachhuber Doyle also served in the Wisconsin State Assembly.

Notes

1832 births
1879 deaths
People from LeRoy, Wisconsin
Businesspeople from Wisconsin
19th-century American politicians
People from Addison, Wisconsin
19th-century American businesspeople
Democratic Party members of the Wisconsin State Assembly